The 1919 International Lawn Tennis Challenge was the 14th edition of what is now known as the Davis Cup. Following four years of non-competition due to World War I, the competition resumed with four teams challenging Australasia for the cup. Australasia defeated Great Britain to retain the title. The final was played at the Double Bay Grounds in Sydney, Australia on 16–21 January 1920.

Draw

Semifinals
Belgium vs. France

Great Britain vs. South Africa

Final
France vs. Great Britain

Challenge Round
Australasia vs. Great Britain

References

External links
Davis Cup official website

Davis Cups by year
International Lawn Tennis Challenge
International Lawn Tennis Challenge
International Lawn Tennis Challenge